Pseudodaphnella crasselirata is a species of sea snail, a marine gastropod mollusk in the family Raphitomidae.

Description
The elongate-fusiform shell shows somewhat rotund whorls. The ribs are packed together and intersected by thick lirae. The white shell is shiny and is dotted with scattered yellowish-brown dots.

Distribution
This marine species occurs off the Gulf of Carpentaria to Queensland, Australia; it also occurs off New Caledonia.

References

 Bouge, L.J. & Dautzenberg, P.L. 1914. Les Pleurotomides de la Nouvelle-Caledonie et de ses dependances. Journal de Conchyliologie 61: 123–214
 Powell, A.W.B. 1966. The molluscan families Speightiidae and Turridae, an evaluation of the valid taxa, both Recent and fossil, with list of characteristic species. Bulletin of the Auckland Institute and Museum. Auckland, New Zealand 5: 1–184, pls 1–23

External links
 
 Li B.-Q. [Baoquan] & Li X.-Z. [Xinzheng] (2014) Report on the Raphitomidae Bellardi, 1875 (Mollusca: Gastropoda: Conoidea) from the China Seas. Journal of Natural History 48(17-18): 999-1025.]

crasselirata
Gastropods described in 1897